The following is a list of state highways in the U.S. state of Louisiana designated in the 1050–1099 range.


Louisiana Highway 1050

Louisiana Highway 1050 (LA 1050) runs  in a north–south direction from LA 440 in Tangipahoa to LA 38 west of Kentwood.  The route's mileposts increase from the northern end contrary to common practice.

LA 1050 heads north on Dr. Martin Luther King Drive from LA 440 (Center Street).  After exiting the village of Tangipahoa, the highway turns due west at a T-intersection with LA 1051 and crosses over without connecting to I-55.  LA 1050 then curves to the northwest and proceeds across LA 1049 to its terminus at LA 38.  LA 1050 is an undivided two-lane highway for its entire length.

In the pre-1955 state highway system, the majority of LA 1050 was designated as State Route 1056.  However, the portion south of LA 1051 was part of pre-1955 Route 33-D and was the original alignment of both Route 33 and US 51 during the 1920s.  LA 1050 was created in the 1955 Louisiana Highway renumbering, and its route has remained the same to the present day.

Louisiana Highway 1051

Louisiana Highway 1051 (LA 1051) runs  in a north–south direction from LA 1050 north of Tangipahoa to LA 1049 in Kentwood.

The route heads north from a T-intersection with LA 1050 located  outside the village of Tangipahoa.  It travels between I-55 to the west and US 51 to the east.  After , LA 1051 enters the town of Kentwood, where it becomes known as 9th Street.  The highway continues to a junction with LA 1049, located at the intersection of 9th Street and Collis B. Temple Sr. Road.  LA 1051 is an undivided two-lane highway for its entire length.

In the pre-1955 state highway system, LA 1051 was part of State Route 33-D and was the original alignment of both Route 33 and US 51 during the 1920s.  LA 1051 was created in the 1955 Louisiana Highway renumbering, and its route has remained the same to the present day.

Louisiana Highway 1052

Louisiana Highway 1052 (LA 1052) ran , consisting of an access road from US 51 to the Camp Moore Condederate Museum and Cemetery north of Tangipahoa.

It immediately crossed the Illinois Central Railroad (now the Canadian National Railway) line at grade then turned north alongside it. After passing the entrance to the Camp Moore Confederate Museum, the route terminated at a dead end next to the cemetery gates. LA 1052 was an undivided two-lane highway for its entire length.

In the pre-1955 state highway system, LA 1052 was designated as State Route C-2219.  This replaced Route 406, an older access road to Camp Moore from what is now LA 440 rather than US 51.  LA 1052 was created in the 1955 Louisiana Highway renumbering, and its route remained the same until it was returned to local control in 2000.

Louisiana Highway 1053

Louisiana Highway 1053 (LA 1053) runs  in a southeast to northwest direction from US 51 in Kentwood to the Mississippi state line west of Osyka.

LA 1053 heads northwest from US 51 (3rd Street) in Kentwood and crosses over without connecting to I-55.  After exiting the town limits, LA 1053 curves to the north and proceeds  to a point on the Mississippi state line at the boundary between Amite and Pike counties.  The highway continues as MS 923, a short connector to MS 584 west of Osyka.  LA 1053 is an undivided two-lane highway for its entire length.

In the pre-1955 state highway system, LA 1053 was designated as State Route 1057.  LA 1053 was created in the 1955 Louisiana Highway renumbering, and its route has remained the same to the present day.

Louisiana Highway 1054

Louisiana Highway 1054 (LA 1054) runs  in a general north–south direction from LA 40 east of Independence to US 51 at Greenlaw.

Louisiana Highway 1055

Louisiana Highway 1055 (LA 1055) runs  in an east–west direction from LA 1054 east of Greenlaw to LA 438 east of Mt. Hermon.

Louisiana Highway 1056

Louisiana Highway 1056 (LA 1056) runs  in an east–west direction from LA 38 east of Spring Creek to LA 440 at Richardson.

Louisiana Highway 1057

Louisiana Highway 1057 (LA 1057) runs  in an east–west direction from the junction of LA 440 and LA 1054 east of Tangipahoa to LA 440 east of Bailey.

Louisiana Highway 1058

Louisiana Highway 1058 (LA 1058) runs  in a north–south direction from LA 10 northeast of Roseland to LA 440 north of Chesbrough.

Louisiana Highway 1059

Louisiana Highway 1059 (LA 1059) runs  in an east–west direction from a local road southwest of Chesbrough to LA 1058 south of Chesbrough. As of 2018, it is under agreement to be removed from the state highway system and transferred to local control.

Louisiana Highway 1060

Louisiana Highway 1060 (LA 1060) ran  in a southeast to northwest direction from US 51 at Arcola to a dead end at Natalbany Creek northwest of Arcola.

Louisiana Highway 1061

Louisiana Highway 1061 (LA 1061) runs  in a general north–south direction from LA 1054 east of Roseland to the junction of LA 38 and LA 1054 north of Spring Creek.

Louisiana Highway 1062

Louisiana Highway 1062 (LA 1062) runs  in a southwest to northeast direction from LA 40 in Loranger to LA 445 south of Husser.

Louisiana Highway 1063

Louisiana Highway 1063 (LA 1063) runs  in a southwest to northeast direction from LA 442 west of Tickfaw to the junction of US 51 and LA 1065 in Independence.

Louisiana Highway 1064

Louisiana Highway 1064 (LA 1064) runs  in an east–west direction from LA 43 north of Albany to LA 443 north of Hammond.

The route heads due east from LA 43 and crosses from Livingston Parish into Tangipahoa Parish.  After , LA 1064 crosses over without connecting to I-55.  The highway proceeds through the small community of Natalbany, where it intersects US 51 (North Morrison Boulevard) between Hammond and Tickfaw.  East of Natalbany, LA 1064 crosses the Canadian National Railway (CN) line at grade and intersects LA 1065 (North Cherry Street).  The route proceeds  further to a T-intersection with LA 443 (Morris Road) just north of Hammond Northshore Regional Airport.  LA 1064 is an undivided two-lane highway for its entire length.

In the pre-1955 state highway system, LA 1064 was designated as State Route 1079.  Upon its creation in the 1955 Louisiana Highway renumbering, LA 1064 also extended northeast concurrent with LA 443 then southeast along River Road, running parallel to the Tangipahoa River to a terminus at US 190 due east of Hammond.  This leg of LA 1064 was transferred to local control in 2017 as part of the La DOTD Road Transfer Program.

Louisiana Highway 1065

Louisiana Highway 1065 (LA 1065) runs  in a north–south direction from US 190 in Hammond to the junction of US 51 and LA 1063 in Independence.  The entire highway is located within Tangipahoa Parish.

Louisiana Highway 1066

Louisiana Highway 1066 (LA 1066) ran  in a southeast to northwest direction from the junction of US 51/US 190 and LA 36 to a second junction with US 51 in Hammond.

Louisiana Highway 1067

Louisiana Highway 1067 (LA 1067) ran  in a general east–west direction from LA 3158 to US 190 east of Hammond.

The route headed due east on Old Covington Highway from LA 3158 (South Airport Road).  After , it curved north past the Louisiana State University Agricultural Experiment Station at Hammond to its terminus at US 190.  LA 1067 was an undivided two-lane highway for its entire length.

LA 1067 originally encompassed all of Old Covington Highway, extending west to US 51 Bus. in Hammond.  It was truncated to LA 3158 when that route was added to the state highway system during the 1970s.  The remainder of LA 1067 was transferred to local control in 2000.  Since then, the four-way stop intersection of Old Covington Highway and LA 3158 has been reconfigured as a roundabout without stop signs.

Louisiana Highway 1068

Louisiana Highway 1068 (LA 1068) ran  in a north–south direction from LA 73 to LA 426 in Baton Rouge.

The southern terminus was located at LA 73 (Jefferson Highway) between the two ramps of a half diamond interchange with I-12 (exit 1B).  From there, LA 1068 proceeded northeast on Drusilla Lane to its terminus at LA 426 (Old Hammond Highway).  It was an undivided two-lane highway for its entire length.

LA 1068 was deleted in 2018 as part of the La DOTD's Road Transfer program.

Louisiana Highway 1069

Louisiana Highway 1069 (LA 1069) runs  in a north–south direction from LA 436 to LA 430 in Franklinton.

The route heads north on 11th Avenue, the continuation of Mott Street, from a four-way intersection where LA 436 turns east from Mott onto Greenlaw Street.  After seven blocks, LA 1069 terminates at an intersection with Bene Street, and the roadway continues northward out of Franklinton as part of LA 430.  Bene Street is signed as LA 430 Spur west of this intersection to its connection with LA 25 at Main Street.  LA 1069 is an undivided two-lane highway for its entire length.

Louisiana Highway 1070

Louisiana Highway 1070 (LA 1070) runs  in a north–south direction from LA 424 to LA 438 north of Pine.

Louisiana Highway 1071

Louisiana Highway 1071 (LA 1071) runs  in a general northwest to southeast direction from LA 21 in Angie to the junction of two local roads northeast of Varnado.

Louisiana Highway 1072

Louisiana Highway 1072 (LA 1072) runs  in a northwest to southeast direction from LA 16 south of Franklinton to LA 60 in Plainview.

The route provides access to Franklinton Airport near its western end.  LA 1072 is an undivided two-lane highway for its entire length.

Louisiana Highway 1073

Louisiana Highway 1073 (LA 1073) runs  in a north–south direction from LA 16 to LA 60 east of Enon.

It is an undivided two-lane highway for its entire length.

Louisiana Highway 1074

Louisiana Highway 1074 (LA 1074) runs  in an east–west direction from LA 16 west of Sun to LA 1075 in Rio.

It is an undivided two-lane highway for its entire length.

Louisiana Highway 1075

Louisiana Highway 1075 (LA 1075) runs  in a north–south direction through unincorporated Washington Parish from LA 21 north of Sun to the Bogalusa city limit.  It is an undivided two-lane highway for its entire length.

LA 1075 splits off from LA 21 north of Sun, a village located just across the St. Tammany Parish line.  The route heads north and runs parallel to LA 21 through the small community of Rio, where it intersects LA 1074.  LA 1075 proceeds to the Bogalusa city limit where a local road, Avenue F, continues into town toward an intersection with LA 60 (West 10th Street).

The LA 1075 designation originally extended north along Avenue F in Bogalusa to the junction with LA 60, but this portion of the route was transferred to the city of Bogalusa in 2015 as part of La DOTD's Road Transfer Program.  The remainder of LA 1075 is proposed to be transferred to Washington Parish in the future.

Louisiana Highway 1076

Louisiana Highway 1076 (LA 1076) ran  in a southeast to northwest direction from LA 21 to LA 10 in Bogalusa.

Louisiana Highway 1077

Louisiana Highway 1077 (LA 1077) runs  in a general north–south direction from a dead end at Lake Pontchartrain in Madisonville to a junction with LA 25 south of Folsom, St. Tammany Parish.

Louisiana Highway 1078

Louisiana Highway 1078 (LA 1078) runs  in an east–west direction from LA 1077 to LA 25 south of Folsom.

LA 1078 begins at a T-intersection near the St. Tammany–Tangipahoa parish line that is signed as LA 1077 in all directions.  LA 1078 heads northeast concurrent with one branch of LA 1077 for  then splits off to the southeast at Savannah Road.  It continues east along Bennett Bridge Road to its terminus at LA 25 south of Folsom.  LA 1078 is an undivided two-lane highway for its entire length.

Louisiana Highway 1079

Louisiana Highway 1079 (LA 1079) runs  in a north–south direction along the east bank of the Tensas River from LA 888 at Westwood, Tensas Parish to a point near the Madison Parish line.

It is an undivided two-lane highway for its entire length.

Louisiana Highway 1080

Louisiana Highway 1080 (LA 1080) ran  in a north–south direction off of LA 40 east of Folsom.  It was an undivided two-lane highway for its entire length.

From the south, LA 1080 began at a dead end near the Bogue Falaya River and headed northward along North Factory Road across LA 40.  The route transitioned to a local road at a right-angle curve just beyond an intersection with Graci Road.

Louisiana Highway 1081

Louisiana Highway 1081 (LA 1081) runs  in a general north–south direction, looping off of LA 437 (Lee Road) north of Covington.

It is an undivided two-lane highway for its entire length.

Louisiana Highway 1082

Louisiana Highway 1082 (LA 1082) runs  in a north–south direction along Old Military Road from LA 21 northeast of Covington to LA 40 west of Bush.

It is an undivided two-lane highway for its entire length.

Louisiana Highway 1083

Louisiana Highway 1083 (LA 1083) runs  in a north–south direction from the junction of two local roads south of Waldheim to LA 40 west of Bush.

From the south, LA 1083 begins on Allen Road at an intersection with Lowe Davis Road about midway between Abita Springs and Waldheim.  The route heads north and intersects LA 21 (Military Road) at Waldheim.  After a brief jog eastward onto LA 21, LA 1083 turns again to the north and follows a winding alignment until reaching its terminus at LA 40.  LA 1083 is an undivided two-lane highway for its entire length.

Louisiana Highway 1084

Louisiana Highway 1084 (LA 1084) runs  in an east–west direction from LA 21 northeast of Covington to LA 1083 south of Waldheim.

It is an undivided two-lane highway for its entire length.

Louisiana Highway 1085

Louisiana Highway 1085 (LA 1085) runs  in a southwest to northeast direction from LA 22 west of Madisonville to LA 1077 north of Madisonville.  The route is bannered north–south.

LA 1085 initially heads north from LA 22 but then curves eastward, crossing over without connect to I-12.  It proceeds a short distance further to a junction with LA 1077 just north of the latter's interchange with I-12.  LA 1085 is an undivided two-lane highway for its entire length.

Louisiana Highway 1086

Louisiana Highway 1086 (LA 1086) ran  in a general east–west direction, looping off of LA 21 in Covington.

Louisiana Highway 1087

Louisiana Highway 1087 (LA 1087) ran  in a general east–west direction from North Causeway Boulevard to the junction of US 190 and LA 59 in Mandeville.

The route headed southeast on Monroe Street from North Causeway Boulevard. This intersection is located at a point where the East Causeway Approach branches off of that thoroughfare at the north end of the Lake Pontchartrain Causeway bridge across Lake Pontchartrain. Girod Street continues across US 190 as LA 59. LA 1087 was an undivided two-lane highway for its entire length.

Louisiana Highway 1088

Louisiana Highway 1088 (LA 1088) runs  in a southwest to northeast direction from LA 59 north of Mandeville to LA 36 west of Hickory.  The route is bannered east–west.

It is an undivided two-lane highway for its entire length.

Louisiana Highway 1089

Louisiana Highway 1089 (LA 1089) ran  in a southwest to northeast direction through Fontainebleau State Park east of Mandeville.  It extended from a point near the shore of Lake Pontchartrain to the park entrance on US 190.

LA 1089 was an undivided two-lane highway for its entire length and was not signed in the field.

Louisiana Highway 1090

Louisiana Highway 1090 (LA 1090) runs  in a north–south direction from US 190 east of Slidell to the junction of I-59 and US 11 south of Pearl River.  The route's mileposts increase from the northern end contrary to common practice.

The route heads north on Military Road from a T-intersection with US 190 at Gause Boulevard.  It passes over without connecting to I-10 and parallels I-59 northward toward Pearl River.  LA 1090 ends at a diamond interchange where US 11 joins the alignment of I-59 at exit 3.  LA 1090 is an undivided two-lane highway for its entire length.

Louisiana Highway 1091

Louisiana Highway 1091 (LA 1091) runs  in a north–south direction from US 190 in Slidell to US 11 south of Pearl River.

LA 1091 heads northward from US 190 (Gause Boulevard) on Robert Boulevard, an undivided four-lane thoroughfare with a center turning lane.  On the way out of Slidell, the roadway narrows to two lanes, and LA 1091 crosses over without connecting to I-12.  The route continues north, traveling between I-59 and US 11 until reaching a T-intersection with the latter at the St. Joe Brick Works south of Pearl River.

Louisiana Highway 1092

Louisiana Highway 1092 (LA 1092) ran  in an east–west direction from the concurrent US 11/US 190 in Slidell to a junction with LA 1090 east of town.  The route is now part of US 190.

Louisiana Highway 1093

Louisiana Highway 1093 (LA 1093) consists of two road segments with a total length of  that are located in the St. Tammany Parish community of Lacombe.  A third segment was deleted from the state highway system in 1987.

LA 1093-1 runs  along Davis Avenue from the junction of US 190 and LA 434 to an intersection with Jackson Street.
LA 1093-2 ran  along North 14th Street from US 190 to LA 1093-1.
LA 1093-3 runs  along North 18th, Beulah, and Jefferson Streets from US 190 to LA 1093-1.

Louisiana Highway 1094

Louisiana Highway 1094 (LA 1094) ran  in a southeast to northwest direction from LA 573 at Mayflower to the junction of two local roads northwest of Mayflower.

Louisiana Highway 1095

Louisiana Highway 1095 (LA 1095) ran  in a north–south direction from LA 722 east of Rayne to LA 98 northeast of Rayne.  The route is now part of LA 98.

Louisiana Highway 1096

Louisiana Highway 1096 (LA 1096) runs  in a loop off of LA 95 from Duson, Lafayette to a point in Acadia Parish north of Duson.

Louisiana Highway 1097

Louisiana Highway 1097 (LA 1097) runs  in an east–west direction along Heritage Road from LA 98 at Arceneaux to LA 95 south of Mire.

Louisiana Highway 1098

Louisiana Highway 1098 (LA 1098) runs  in a general southwest to northeast direction from LA 95 north of Mire to LA 365 east of Higginbotham.

Louisiana Highway 1099

Louisiana Highway 1099 (LA 1099) runs  in an east–west direction along Kayla Lane from LA 1098 to LA 365 southeast of Higginbotham.

See also

References

External links
Maps / GIS Data Homepage, Louisiana Department of Transportation and Development